is a well known Kyogen stage actor, and  film actor. He played Abe no seimei in Onmyoji and Onmyoji 2, an original work by Baku Yumemakura. He received the Best Actor prize at the Blue Ribbon Awards for his work in Onmyoji.

Career
His debut was at the age of three in the drama, Quiver of The Monkey. Since then he has also been cast in the dramas: in Aguri in 1997, for which he played dadaist poet Eisuke Yoshiyuki and had won many awards, and in Hana no Ran in 1994.

He also had a supporting role in Akira Kurosawa's last epic motion picture Ran, as the blind flute playing hermit boy, Tsurumaru. He portrayed Godzilla through motion capture in Shin Godzilla.

Mansai was nominated by the Japanese Academy for best actor for his performance in The Floating Castle.

In March 2013, he appeared at the Japan Society and the Guggenheim Museum Rotunda in two productions: Shakespeare's Macbeth adapted to the noh and kyogen traditions with five actors, performed in Japanese with English subtitles and Sanbaso, Divine Dance.

On July 30th, 2018, Mansai was appointed chief executive creative director of the Tokyo 2020 Olympic and Paralympic Games. Between July 2018 and December 2020, he oversaw planning for opening and closing ceremonies of both Games, before stepping down from the role as the original ceremony team disbanded.

Filmography

Film
The Yin Yang Master (2001), Abe no Seimei
The Yin Yang Master 2 (2003), Abe no Seimei
The Floating Castle (2012), Narita Nagachika
The Wind Rises (2013), Giovanni Battista Caproni (voice)
Shin Godzilla (2016), Godzilla through motion capture
Flower and Sword (2017), Ikenobō Senkō
Whistleblower (2019), Tamio Yasumi
Revolver Lily (2023)

Television  
Hana no Ran (1994), Hosokawa Katsumoto
Aguri (1997), Eisuke
Doctor-X: Surgeon Michiko Daimon (2021), Hachisuka Ryutaro
What Will You Do, Ieyasu? (2023), Imagawa Yoshimoto

References

External links
 

1966 births
Living people
Japanese male actors
Noh